The Loppi church village (also known as Loppi) is the largest village in the Loppi municipality on the northern shore of Lake Loppi (Loppijärvi) in Tavastia Proper, Finland, and also its administrative center with a population of more than 2,000.

The Loppi village is located along the main road 54 between Forssa and Riihimäki. To the east of the urban area is the regional road 132, which starts from the main road and runs south in the direction of Helsinki, along which the Läyliäinen village is located about 12 kilometers from the church village. The center of the village focuses on the surroundings of the intersection between roads Yhdystie, Jokiniementie and Pilpalantie.

There are as many as two churches in the church village: the wooden church of Saint Birgitta (Santa Pirjo), known as the old wooden church of Loppi, located on the shores of Lake Loppi, and the newer red brick church of Loppi, located near the center of the village. Other main services in the village include a municipal health center, two grocery stores (K-market and S-market), a library founded in 1852,  and a primary school founded in 1921, as well as a high school.

References

External links
 Lopen kunta (in Finnish)
 Häme-Wiki - Loppi (in Finnish)

Loppi
Villages in Finland